Renos Apostolidis (2 March 1924 – 10 March 2004) was a Greek writer, philologist and literary critic.

His father was Heracles N. Apostolidis, a notable journalist and director of the National Library between 1945 and 1959.   His mother Elpiniki (née Zambeli) was a teacher.

Early life 
Apostolidis was born in Athens in 1924. His father was Heracles N. Apostolidis, who was a journalist, chief editor in several newspaper agencies, head of Encyclopaedia of Pyrsos publishing, head of the National Library (1945–1959) and creator of the first Poetry and Short Stories Anthology. His mother, Elpiniki, was a teacher. After primary school, he attended Varvakeios High School (1935–1941), where on 28 October 1941 organized student abstention. Apostolidis participated in the banned, by Papandreou government, march on 3 December 1944 with EAM followers. From 1945, Apostolidis studied in the department of History and Archaeology of the University of Athens, but was forced to suspend his studies in order to pay his duties in the Greek Army during the Civil War, where he participated as Second lieutenant of the National Army. Living so close with destruction and death, Apostolidis stated that he swore to himself not to shoot a single bullet, but to record what he was going through for two and a half years in Grammos, Vitsi and during the cleansing operations of Roumeli and Peloponnese. As soon as he was released from his duties, he published Pyramid 67, a text about the Civil War. He was dismissed characterized as a second rank nationalist.

In 1950 he completed his studies and had taught Ancient and Modern Greek, History and Latin in private high schools of Athens. He emerged as a writer in 1944, with the publishing of the essay "Kairos tou einai" in Grammata periodical. A year later, he issued his first essay collection Three stations of a march. He collaborated with several newspapers and periodicals of Athens as an editor of Eleutheria, Niki, Eikones, Gnoseis, Neoteron Lexicon Iliou, Aneksartitos Typos and other publications, as well as book critic in Grammata, Fititiki Foni, Deltion tou Vivliou, Kiklos, Kochlias, Nea Estia, Neoi Rithmoi, Nees Ikones, Ethnos, Ethnikos Kirikas, Epoptia and Nea Koinoniologia.

Since 1951, he worked as chief editor and critic in the periodical Our Aeon, and in 1952, established with his father the periodical The New Greek. From the latter's pages he exercised intense criticism "against the political and literary establishment", and particularly against the "Generation of the '30s", accusing them of "spiritual and ethical inadequacy". For this posture of him, M. Karagatsis sued him and his father for reasons of copyright.

In 1966 Apostolidis started publishing in serials in The New Greek fragments from the "Diary" of Ioannis Metaxas accompanied with his own sarcastic commentary. These publishes caused the reaction of the newly established organisation Party of 4 August, leader of which was Konstantinos Pleuris, who attacked Apostolidis from the organisation's newspaper and after Apostolidis's response Pleuris filed a lawsuit against him. The trial took place after the Coup of 21 April 1967, and the establishment of military dictatorship, and so the circulation of "The New Greek" stopped, which until then had published five articles related to the first two volumes of Metaxas's diary. In court, Apostolidis was sentenced, but in the Court of Appeal stated that it was not his intention to touch on the members of the Party of 4 August and the lawsuit was recalled.

Politics 
From 1962 to 1964, Apostolidis served as a collaborator with the Directorate-General of the National Radio Foundation. In the parliamentary elections of 1963 he participated as a candidate under Spyridon Markezinis, while already since 1961 had written for the periodical of the youth of the Progressive party. In the municipal elections of 1964 descended as candidate for municipal consultant in Athens's municipality in the line up of Georgios Plytas. In 1964, Apostolidis was the head of an wrathful crowd of extreme Right-wings who entered the Parliament with the slogan Traitor Papandreou, Karamanlis, Papandreou Imposter. The crowd fought with parliament members of the center, an act for which Apostolidis was arrested and sentenced to two and a half years in prison, however, he served three months in total.

Dictatorship 
During the dictatorship in Greece, in 1969, Colonel Georgios Papadopoulos imposed compulsory issue of the Short stories Anthology of Heracles N. Apostolidis in the Athenian Press, under condition of not being censored. Thus, in this way texts belonging to dissidents were published like those of the politically exiled Demetris Hantzis. However, the publication in two newspapers part of Renos Apostolidis's novel The A2, written in 1968 about the Greek Civil War, provoked the intervention of censorship and the suspension of the publishing after direct interference of Ioannes Ladas, the general secretary of the Ministry of Public Order and one of the orchestrators of the 1967 coup d'état.

Later years 
After the end of the dictatorship, until 1979, Apostolidis continued writing critics in the periodical Tetramina and published several of his works. In his later years he published lectures and appeared on television for matters regarding the Greek language, education and literature. He was also honorary guest in presentations of his works. He was a supporter of the polytonic writing, the historical Greek orthography and the teaching of ancient Greek from prototypes in schools.

Death 
Apostolidis died on 10 March 2004 after acute stroke. He received a non-religious burial, due to him being an agnostic and libertarian.

Works
Renos Apostolidis was a prolific writer. During his lifetime he published over 30 books. His first published work was Three Stations a Path (1945). Some of his most famous works are Wings of The Stork (1949), Poet Letters (1949), Pyramid 67 (1950), Modern Greek (1952), His Nipples and Manuscripts of Max Tod (1960), Criticism of War (1962), Corridors (1979), The Furies (1980) and Cats (1989), and Vortex (1993). One book, Centauri'' was published posthumously, in 2012.

References

1924 births
2004 deaths
Greek writers
Greek educators
Greek philologists
20th-century philologists
Writers from Athens